Xenomyrmex is a genus of small ants in the subfamily Myrmicinae. The genus is known from Florida (United States), the West Indies, and from Mexico to at least Panama. They nest in cavities of living or dead plants.

Species
 Xenomyrmex floridanus Emery, 1895
 Xenomyrmex panamanus (Wheeler, 1922)
 Xenomyrmex stollii Forel, 1885

References

External links

Myrmicinae
Ant genera
Hymenoptera of North America